Andrey Kren (born 11 November 2003) is a Belarusian professional footballer who plays for Slutsk.

References

External links 
 
 

2003 births
Living people
People from Ivatsevichy District
Sportspeople from Brest Region
Belarusian footballers
Association football midfielders
FC Slutsk players